Crețu River may refer to:

Crețu, a tributary of the Șercaia in Brașov County, Romania
Crețu, a tributary of the Moneasa in Arad County, Romania

See also 
Crețu, a village in Dâmbovița County, Romania
Crețu (surname)